Suoniemi may refer to:

Suoniemi, Finland, village and former municipality
 Kalevi Suoniemi, Finnish gymnast